Axel Finnberg (born 5 April 1971) is a German former professional tennis player.

A right-handed player from Bremen, Finnberg played on the professional tour in the 1990s. He made his ATP Tour main draw debut in Adelaide in 1991, where he lost in the first round to Thomas Enqvist.

In 1994 he reached his career best ranking of 231 in the world and made the second round of the 1994 Oahu Open. He twice featured in the qualifying draw for the Australian Open, including in 1994 when he had a win over Vince Spadea.

References

External links
 
 

1971 births
Living people
German male tennis players
Sportspeople from Bremen